Plant transformation vectors are plasmids that have been specifically designed to facilitate the generation of transgenic plants.  The most commonly used plant transformation vectors are termed binary vectors because of their ability to replicate in both E. coli, a common lab bacterium and Agrobacterium tumefaciens, a bacterium used to insert the recombinant (customized) DNA into plants.
Plant Transformation vectors contain three key elements;
 Plasmids Selection (creating a custom circular strand of DNA)
 Plasmids Replication (so that it can be easily worked with)
 Transfer DNA (T-DNA) region (inserting the DNA into the agrobacteria)

Steps in plant transformation
Propagate binary vector in E. coli

Isolate binary vector from E.coli and engineer (introduce a foreign gene)

Re-introduce engineered binary vector into E. coli to amplify

Isolate engineered binary vector and introduce into Agrobacteria containing a modified (relatively small) Ti plasmid

Infect plant tissue with engineered Agrobacteria (T-DNA containing the foreign gene gets inserted into a plant cell genome)

In each cell T-DNA gets integrated at a different site in the genome

Note: There are many variations to these steps. A custom DNA plasmid sequence can be created and replicated in more than one way.

Consequences of the insertion 
Foreign DNA inserted

Insertional mutagenesis (but not lethal for the plant cell – as the organism is diploid)

Transformation DNA fed to rodents ends up in their phagocytes and rarely other cells. Specifically this is bacterial and M13 DNA. (This preferential accumulation in phagocytes is thought to be real and not a detection artifact since these DNA extents are thought to provoke phagocytosis.) However no gene expression is known to have resulted, and this is not thought to be possible.

Problem 
We want to transform the whole organism, not just one cell. This is done by transforming plant cells in culture, selecting transformed cells and regenerating an entire plant from the transformed cell (e.g. tobacco)

Plasmid selection
When the bacteria with the desired, implanted gene are grown, they are made containing a selector. A selector is a way to isolate and distinguish the desired cells. A gene that makes the cells resistant to an antibiotic such as the antibiotics kanamycin, ampicillin, spectinomycin or tetracycline is an easy selector to use. The desired cells (along with any other organisms growing within the culture) can be treated with an antibiotic allowing the desired cells to survive while other organisms cannot. The antibiotic gene is not usually transferred to the plant cell but remains within the bacterial cell.

Plasmids replication
Plasmids replicate to produce many plasmid molecules in each host bacterial cell.  The number of copies of each plasmid in a bacterial cell is determined by the replication origin.  This is the position within the plasmids molecule where DNA replication is initiated.  Most binary vectors have a higher number of plasmid copies when they replicate in E. coli, the plasmid copy-number is usually less when the plasmid is resident within Agrobacterium tumefaciens.
Plasmids can also be replicated in the polymerase chain reaction (PCR).

T-DNA region

T-DNA contains two types of genes: the oncogenic genes encoding for enzymes involved in the synthesis of auxins and cytokinins and responsible for tumor formation; and the genes encoding for the synthesis of opines. These compounds, produced by condensation between amino acids and sugars, are synthesized and excreted by the crown gall cells and consumed by A. tumefaciens as carbon and nitrogen sources. Outside the T-DNA, are located the genes for the opine catabolism, the genes involved in the process of T-DNA transfer from the bacterium to the plant cell and the genes involved in bacterium-bacterium plasmid conjugative transfer. (Hooykaas and Schilperoort, 1992; Zupan and Zambrysky, 1995). The T-DNA fragment is flanked by 25-bp direct repeats, which act as a cis element signal for the transfer apparatus. The process of T-DNA transfer is mediated by the cooperative action of proteins encoded by genes determined in the Ti plasmid virulence region (vir genes) and in the bacterial chromosome. The Ti plasmid also contains the genes for opine catabolism produced by the crown gall cells and regions for conjugative transfer and for its own integrity and stability. The 30 kb virulence (vir) region is a regulon organized in six operons that are essential for the T-DNA transfer (virA, virB, virD, and virG) or for the increasing of transfer efficiency (virC and virE) (Hooykaas and Schilperoort, 1992; Zupan and Zambryski, 1995, Jeon et al., 1998). Different chromosomal-determined genetic elements have shown their functional role in the attachment of A. tumefaciens to the plant cell and bacterial colonization: the loci chvA and chvB, involved in the synthesis and excretion of the b -1,2 glucan (Cangelosi et al., 1989) the  required for the sugar enhancement of vir genes induction and bacterial chemotaxis (Ankenbauer et al., 1990, Cangelosi et al., 1990, 1991) the cell locus, responsible for the synthesis of cellulose fibrils (Matthysse 1983); the  locus playing its role in the synthesis of both cyclic glucan and acid succinoglycan (Cangelosi et at. 1987, 1991) and the att locus, which is involved in the cell surface proteins (Matthysse, 1987).

References

 Technical Focus:a guide to Agrobacterium binary Ti vectors Trends in Plant Science 5(10): 446-451 2000

Transformation vector
Molecular biology
Mobile genetic elements
Molecular biology techniques
Gene delivery